Richard Warren Cooper (born November 1, 1964) is a former American football offensive tackle for the New Orleans Saints and the Philadelphia Eagles in a nine-year career in the National Football League.  He played college football at the University of Tennessee. He played high school football at Melrose High School (Memphis, Tennessee)

1964 births
Living people
American football offensive tackles
Tennessee Volunteers football players
New Orleans Saints players
Philadelphia Eagles players
Players of American football from Memphis, Tennessee